Jean Campeau,  (born July 6, 1931) is a Quebec businessman and former politician.

Born in Montreal, Quebec, he was elected to the National Assembly of Quebec for the district of Crémazie in 1994. From 1994 to 1995, he was the Minister of Finance in the cabinet of Jacques Parizeau. From 1995 to 1996, he was the Minister of Transport. He did not run in 1998.

In 1990, he was made a Grand Officer of the National Order of Quebec.

References
 

1931 births
Living people
Businesspeople from Montreal
French Quebecers
Grand Officers of the National Order of Quebec
Parti Québécois MNAs
Politicians from Montreal